The Royal National Hospital for Rheumatic Diseases is a small, specialist NHS hospital on the Royal United Hospital (RUH) site in the northwestern outskirts of Bath, England.

The hospital was founded in 1738 as a general hospital for the poor in the city centre, where the frontage of its building still reads Royal Mineral Water Hospital. Thus it is known locally as "The Mineral Hospital" or "The Min". The hospital moved to a new building at the RUH site in 2019.

History
From the 16th century, the needs of the "deserving poor" who came to take the healing waters of the Roman Baths were recognised and an act of 1597 gave them the right to free use of the waters. This attracted beggars and, although the act was repealed in 1714, large numbers of people were still attracted to the city and St John's Hospital was only accessible to local residents. Plans were suggested for a hospital to receive them in 1716 with supporters who included Lady Elizabeth Hastings, Henry Hoare, Joseph Jekyll, William Oliver and Beau Nash.

The hospital was founded in 1738 as The Mineral Water Hospital. It provided care for the impoverished sick who were attracted to Bath because of the supposed healing properties of the mineral water from the spa. The original building, which was designed by John Wood the Elder, was built with Bath stone donated by Ralph Allen and completed in 1742. It was later enlarged, firstly in 1793 by the addition of an attic storey and later in 1860 by a second building erected on the west side of the earlier edifice. There is a fine pediment, in Bath stone, on the 1860 building depicting the parable of the Good Samaritan. The building was classified as Grade II* listed in 1972.

In 2003, the hospital became an NHS Foundation Trust, specialising in rheumatic disease and rehabilitation, which received a three-star rating in 2005. The hospital had a large brain injury rehabilitation service with separate units for adults, adolescents and children; this service closed in March 2013 as a result of financial pressures.

The hospital was named by the Health Service Journal as the best acute specialist trust to work for in 2015.  At that time it had 208 full-time equivalent staff and a sickness absence rate of  3.18%. 91% of staff recommended it as a place for treatment and 79% recommended it as a place to work.

Royal United Hospitals
It was announced in January 2015 that the Royal National Hospital for Rheumatic Diseases NHS Foundation Trust would be taken over by Royal United Hospitals Bath NHS Foundation Trust, after financial debts had built up toward £2million. During 2015 and 2016, some services were transferred to the Royal United Hospital (RUH), including endoscopy and children's services.

Construction started on a building at the RUH's Combe Park site in November 2017, to house the Royal National Hospital and the Brownsword Therapies centre. The first departments from the Mineral Hospital and the RUH transferred to the new building in September 2019, and all services were transferred to the RUH site by the end of that year. Camilla, Duchess of Cornwall, who is President of the Royal Osteoporosis Society, formally opened the hospital and therapies centre on 22 October 2019.

Five 18th-century oil paintings from the Mineral Water Hospital were re-hung at the RUH, notably a work of William Hoare titled Dr Oliver and Mr Pierce examining patients with Paralysis, Rheumatism and Leprosy.

Services
The hospital provides local rheumatology services, and also has specialist clinics and services which attract referrals from a national population. Specialist rheumatology clinics include connective tissue disease, ankylosing spondylitis, fibromyalgia, osteoporosis, and Paget's disease. The hospital is a regional centre of excellence for the treatment of lupus.

Nationally commissioned specialist services include:
 Bath Centre for Fatigue Service – for adults experiencing longstanding fatigue linked to a variety of illnesses
 Bath Centre for Pain Services – pain rehabilitation for people with chronic pain, of all ages
 Complex Regional Pain Syndrome Service and the Complex Cancer Late Effects Rehabilitation Service – intensive rehabilitation for adults who are living with complex regional pain syndrome or the late effects of cancer treatment

Future of Mineral Hospital building 

The historic city centre site at Upper Borough Walls was offered for sale by the RUH Trust in 2017. It was bought by Versant Developments & Homes of Winchester, who sold it to Singapore-based Fragrance Group in January 2018 for £21.5M. Fragrance Group, which owns other historic hotels in England, obtained planning permission in July 2021 to convert the building into a 160-bed hotel by removing 20th-century additions and building an extension, while protecting Roman features.

The planning committee of Bath and North East Somerset Council had rejected a 2020 application by Fragrance Group, after the proposed extension was criticised for its size and height.

Archives 
Some records relating to the hospital are held at Bath Record Office and the Somerset Archives.

See also
 Healthcare in Somerset
 List of hospitals in England

References

External links
 
 RNHRD art collection – Art at the RUH
 The Royal National Hospital for Rheumatic Diseases National Health Service Trust (Transfer of Trust Property) Order 1993
 Bath Medical Museum

1738 establishments in England
Buildings and structures in Bath, Somerset
Grade II* listed buildings in Bath, Somerset
Hospitals in Somerset
Hospital buildings completed in 1860
NHS hospitals in England
Specialist hospitals in England
Hydropathic hospitals
Hospitals established in the 1730s
Organisations based in Bath, Somerset